The 1941 South Dorset by-election was held on 22 February 1941.  The by-election was held due to the succession to the peerage by writ of acceleration of the incumbent Conservative MP, Robert Gascoyne-Cecil, as Baron Cecil of Essendon the junior subsidiary title of The Marquessate of Salisbury then held by his father.  It was won by the Conservative candidate Victor Montagu.

References

1941 in England
1941 elections in the United Kingdom
By-elections to the Parliament of the United Kingdom in Dorset constituencies
20th century in Dorset
Unopposed by-elections to the Parliament of the United Kingdom (need citation)